Wine in Palestine has been in production for several years. In the region of Palestine, the use of wine was not only an important factor in Jewish religious ritual, but also a necessity for social interaction, general dietary consumption and medicinal purposes. During the Byzantine period, large-scale production led to international commerce in the commodity, and Palestinian wine was exported around the Mediterranean region. Production by Christians diminished with the Islamic conquest in the 7th century and was temporarily revived with the settlement of Frankish Christians under the Crusades in the 1100s. Jews continued to cultivate vineyards in the late 15th century into the Ottoman period. The first modern wineries were established by German settlers at Sarona (now a neighborhood of Tel Aviv in Israel) in 1874/5 and by Jews at Rishon LeZion (also in Israel) in 1882.

Antiquity 

Ancient Egypt was supplied with Canaan wine as early as the Early and Late Bronze Ages. Many Canaan wine jugs were discovered at Abydos, Egypt inside the royal Umm el-Qa'ab tombs of the Early Dynastic Period of Egypt (c. 3100 BCE), suggesting that wine from Canaan was a crucial part of elite banquets. Wine offerings were a common feature of Near Eastern ancient worship. Egyptians from the 15th century BCE described the wine of Canaan as being "more abundant than water." Wine was also to be used later in the Jewish sacrificial ritual to supplement other offerings.

Roman and Byzantine period 

Vines were among the three major crops cultivated in Roman and Byzantine Palestine and there are numerous remains of ancient winery installations. Wine was produced throughout the region, from the fertile plains in the north, to the arid areas of the Negev. In Akhziv, an enormous press with the capacity for 59,000 litres was dated to the 4th century. Archaeology suggests that there was a substantial increase in production in the early Byzantine period and most of the large-scale presses date to this era. The rabbis of the Talmudic era devoted much attention to wine production and commerce and instituted many laws religious pertaining to it. Although the Talmud states that "the wine of Tyre was cheaper than Palestinian wine," nowhere does it mention that wine was ever exported abroad. Various other sources from the Byzantine period reveal that this indeed occurred. Around the mid-fourth century, the anonymous writer of Expositio totius mundi et gentium states: "Ashkelon and Gaza…export the best wine to all Syria and Egypt." Transport jars or amphorae have been found in large quantities at various Mediterranean sites, at harbours and as parts of shipwrecked cargos off the shores of Cyprus, Greece and Asia Minor. Significant international trade in Palestinian wine started in the early 5th century, and lasted another 250 years. The deposits of Palestinian amphorae in foreign regions is substantial. They show that Palestinian wines were exported as far as Spain, Gaul and even Wales. In this period, they accounted for 45% of amphorae found in Carthage, 20% at 6th-century Argos and Marseille and 16% at Naples in the 7th century. It is assumed that the Palestinian Bag Jar, one of the most common forms of pottery to be found in the southern Levant, carried white Palestinian wine when exported. John the Almsgiver (7th-cent.) is said to have admired the aromatic bouquet of the expensive Palestinian wine he was offered in Alexandria. Coming from the land of the Bible, Palestinian wine appealed to Christian priests for use during the Eucharist.

Islamic and Crusader period 
In the late 7th century, the Western Church stopped using Palestinian wine, probably because it became too expensive or unavailable after the Arab invasion. During the first Islamic centuries, wine continued to be produced and was not only consumed by Christians and Jews, but by Muslims as well, who compiled "wine poems" in their honour. In the later periods of Muslim domination, wine making diminished as the cultivation of vineyards was either restricted or was forbidden by religious Islamic law. An ancient press vat found at Rechovot (in Israel) indicates that it went out of use during the 8th-9th centuries, it being used instead as a rubbish pit. When the Crusaders took Palestine in the 12th century, the demand for wine by the Latin Church and among the Frankish city-dwellers made vine-growing a lucrative business once again. The Franks established vine-growing settlements and even after they abandoned their colony at Ramathes (modern day Al-Ram) in 1187, it continued to produce wine until the late 15th century. Meshullam of Volterra (1481) found that in Gaza, only the Jews were involved in the production of wine.

Ottoman era and British Mandate

1500s–1700s 
In the 16th century, although the Ottoman authorities forbade wine consumption by Muslims, they tolerated its sale to non-Muslims. Later, in 1754, an Ottoman regulation aimed at preventing drunkenness and immodesty, prohibited Jews from selling wine to Muslims or Christians.

1800s–1900s 
The mid-19th century saw a rapid expansion of grape cultivation, mostly by Jewish farmers. Rabbi Isaac Schorr founded a modern Palestinian winery in Jerusalem in 1848. The same year, a Palestinian messenger (i.e. a Jewish community representative) on a fund-raising mission to Jamaica brought with him 32 barrels of wine of the Land of Israel, with the proceeds from its sale going to relief for the Jews back in Palestine. In 1870, Rabbi Abraham Tepperberg founded the Efrat winery in the Old City of Jerusalem and the Jewish Agricultural School at Mikveh Israel began growing the first vines of European variety.

The German Templers who founded a colony at Sarona in 1871 adopted viticulture as one of their industries. They introduced the first wine factory and the first modern wine cellars into Palestine. In 1874/5 a winery co-operative was formed and the first winery and cellars were built. A second winery was built in 1890 and export of wine to Germany began. In 1898 a new larger winery was built by the Deutsche Weinbaugenossenschaft Sarona-Jaffa (German Winegrowers' Co-operative of Sarona-Jaffa). By the end of the 1890s, there were 150 hectares of vineyards producing 4000 hectoliters (106,000 US gallons) annually.

The new Templer settlement of Wilhelma was added to the wine cooperative in 1902. Wine production at Sarona and Wilhelma continued during the British Mandate, with overseas sales mostly to southern Germany.

Jewish vine cultivation on a large commercial scale began in 1882 with the opening of the Carmel Winery in Rishon LeZion. It was the initiative of Baron Edmond James de Rothschild who invested millions of francs to develop Palestinian viticulture, the growing and the production of wines and cognacs. American vine stocks were imported upon which French shoot were grafted. French experts were brought over to assist in the project. A large wine cellar was built and modern machinery was installed. Rothschild was nevertheless forced to purchase Palestinian wine at above-market prices to keep the operation viable.  Kosher red wine was sweet and lacking in sophistication.  British Prime Minister Benjamin Disraeli  remarked that it tasted "not so much like wine, but more like what I expect to receive from my doctor as a remedy for a bad winter cough." 

Other wineries established in this period and still functioning today include the Cremisan Monastery, near Bethlehem, where Italian Salesian monks have been making wine since 1885 and the Latrun Monastery where French Trappist monks began winemaking in 1899. Vineyard acreage in the Jewish sector totalled around 11,000 dunam in 1890 and around 26,000 dunam by 1900.

In 1883, M. Chaikin & Co. was founded in the United Kingdom. It imported wine produced in Petah Tikva  bearing the name "Bozwin" (Beauty of Zion Wine). In 1898, another London company, the Palestine Wine Trading Co., was established. A "wine-war" erupted between the two British companies, both claiming the exclusive importation of kosher Palestinian wine. Today, Palwin, an abbreviation for "Palestine wine" and produced by Carmel Winery, is Israel's oldest brand, producing 100,000 bottles every year. Palestinian wine received the gold medal at the Paris Exposition of 1900.

By 1903, wine constituted Palestine's third-largest export and continued to be a key economic commodity. The Standard Encyclopedia of the Alcohol Problem (1929) stated that Palestinian wine was intoxicating, contrary to statements which asserted that it is "so light and pure, that a person may drink almost any quantity of it without feeling any unpleasant effects."

Before World War I, the United States and Russia were the largest markets for Palestine wine. Due to the war and with the advent of Prohibition in the United States in 1920, the  market declined dramatically. In the early 1920s, American Orthodox Jewish congregations unsuccessfully petitioned the authorities to allow the import of Palestinian wine for sacramental use over the Passover holiday. Large stocks of unsold wine was being used to make jam and concentrated grape juice for the European markets. In December 1926, the US prohibition department allowed the import of Palestinian kosher wine, which was obtained by Jews through the rabbis of their congregations. The Repeal of Prohibition in 1933 led to an American contract with Rothschild winery which initially provided for the importation of one million bottles of wines and liquor from Palestine over three years, a $15,000,000 concern. The contract was later revised to allow for the import of for 3,000,000 bottles in 1934 alone. Early 1934 saw a 30% increase in the export of Palestinian wine, most of it shipped to the US, from where Palestine had been receiving "urgent requests for tens of thousands of bottles of Jewish wine." In order to meet the demand, Palestinian vintners planned to establish new areas in Samaria for grape cultivation. The lifting of the Prohibition in the United States and permission to import Palestinian wine rejuvenated the wine growing business in Palestine. Yet, in Poland, sales of Palestinian wine reached a record low in 1936 owing to poverty among Jewish buyers. In March 1936, the issue of whether increasing alcohol consumption in Palestine was arousing resentment among the Arabs was raised in the House of Commons. The Colonial Secretary rejected a request that the issuance of retail liquor sale licenses in Palestine be halted. When food distribution was disrupted during WWII, Jewish merchants in Palestine agreed to exchange 500 tons of potatoes from Syria for the equivalent in wine.

Modern industry 

Cremisan Winery, founded in 1885, is the oldest winery in Palestine and produces award-winning wines sold globally. The vineyard was founded and is owned by the Salesians who founded it to create local jobs and fund assistance to the needy.

Nadim Khoury, a Palestinian who is known for establishing Taybeh Brewery, has also opened a winery in the West Bank Christian majority village of Taybeh. Using 21 indigenous varieties of grapes, the wines produced were quick to gain visitors' praise. Khoury admits that Israeli restrictions has made it difficult to do business, his shipments for example, including his wine-making equipment, have been delayed because of Israeli checkpoint inspections. Other problems that the business owners endure, is difficulty shipping to the United States, due to the fact that there is no free trade agreement between the two countries. A wine festival is now held annually in the town.

See also 

 History of wine
 Israeli wine
 Wine in the Middle East

References

Bibliography
 
 
 
 
 
 
 
 
 
 
 
 
 
 Glenk, Helmut; Blaich, Horst; Haering, Manfred (2005). From Desert Sands to Golden Oranges: The History of the German Templer Settlement of Sarona in Palestine 1871-1947. Trafford Publishing.
 
 
 
 
 
 
 
 
 
 
 
 
 
 
Jewish Telegraphic Agency Press Releases

Further reading 
 Kingsley, Sean. (Oxford, 2001). The Economic Impact of the Palestinian Wine Trade in Late Antiquity.
 Walsh, Carey Ellen (2000). The Fruit of the Vine: Viticulture in Ancient Israel. Harvard Semitic Monographs / Eisenbrauns: Winona Lake, Indiana.

External links 

 New York City Library: Palestine Wines on the menu of the Fast Hotel, Jerusalem, in 1938.

 
Wine by country
Palestinian cuisine
History of Palestine (region)